Propebela nivea is a species of sea snail, a marine gastropod mollusk in the family Mangeliidae.

Description

Distribution
This species occurs in the Sea of Japan

References

 Okutani, T. 1968, Bathyal and abyssal Mollusca trawled from Sagami Bay and the south off Boso Peninsula by the R/V Soyo-Maru, 1965-1967. Bull. Tokai Reg. Fish. Res. Lab., 56: 7–56

External links
 

nivea
Gastropods described in 1968